Sports in the Philippines is an important part of the country's culture.
There are six major sports in the Philippines: basketball, boxing, tennis, football, billiards, and volleyball. Despite being a tropical nation, ice skating has recently become a popular sport in the Philippines. Sports such as athletics, weightlifting, aerobics, and martial arts are also popular recreations.

On July 27, 2009, President Gloria Macapagal Arroyo signed Republic Act No. 9850 into law, declaring Arnis as the Philippine National Martial Art and Sport.

Administration
The governing agency for sports in the Philippines is the Philippine Sports Commission which was created in 1990 while the Games and Amusements Board is the government's regulatory body for professional sports in the country.

The Philippine Olympic Committee (POC), a private entity is the sports body which represents the Philippines in international sports competition sanctioned by the International Olympic Committee including the Olympic Games. The POC was established in 1975, replacing the Philippine Amateur Athletic Federation which was founded in 1911. The POC's membership also includes national sports associations (NSAs), organizations which governs a specific sport or discipline in the country. The Philippine Paralympic Committee is the POC's counterpart in disabled sports and is a member of the International Paralympic Committee.

There are also other alternative sporting bodies such as the Federation of School Sports Association of the Philippines which claims to be the sole governing body for university sports in the country and participates in International University Sports Federation (FISU) sanctioned tournaments.

Summary by discipline

Traditional sports

The Philippines has numerous traditional sports that were popular before the colonial era and after the colonial era. Among these are archery, arnis, horse-riding, fling sports, wrestling sports, dart sports, track sports, and traditional martial arts.

With the sport of cockfighting being wildly popular in the Philippines, attracting large crowds who bet on the outcome of fights between the birds, and the sport itself a popular form of fertility worship among almost all Southeast Asians. Such sports activity as the sport of cockfighting, related to ritual forms of worship as practices and rituals of ancient worship intended for the blessings of the supernatural, as "in Indus Valley and other ancient civilizations, mother goddess had been invoked for fertility and prosperity" which included that religious cockfight lay as a prime example of "cultural synthesis of 'little' and 'great' cultures"

Individual sports

Boxing

The Philippines has produced one of the most number of boxing champions in the world such as Francisco Guilledo (Pancho Villa), Ceferino Garcia, Nonito Donaire (The Filipino Flash) and Manny Pacquiao (Pacman).

Boxing is among the most popular individual sports in the Philippines. Some Filipino boxers such as Manny Pacquiao, Gabriel Elorde and Pancho Villa are recognized internationally. The Amateur Boxing Association of the Philippines is the governing body for amateur boxing in the country.

The Association of Boxing Alliances in the Philippines (formerly Amateur Boxing Association of the Philippines) (ABAP) is the governing body of amateur boxing in the Philippines. The ABAP's current goal is for the country to win its first ever Olympic gold medal in boxing, to be recognized as one of the world's boxing powers as well as to improve the image of the Philippines abroad.

The country continually produces talented fighters, often in the junior featherweight division (122 pounds and below). The International Boxing Association sanctions amateur (Olympic-style) boxing matches which allows the national amateur boxing athletes of the Philippines to represent the country and compete in regional, continental and international matches and tournaments. The Philippines has currently two silver and three bronze Olympic medals.

Figure skating
Ice skating rinks used as venues for figure skating are limited to shopping malls in the country, particularly in the Metro Manila area. The first ice skating rink in the country was opened in 1992 at SM Megamall in Mandaluyong. The first Olympic sized ice skating rink was opened at the SM Mall of Asia. An ice skating rink also operates in SM Southmall. There are more figure skating coaches in the Philippines than ice hockey coaches and the first Filipino ice skating coaches were roller skaters. The Philippine Championship is a national competitive for ice skating in which the winner gets to represent the country in international competitions. The Philippines has also managed to qualify and send a figure skater to the 2014 Winter Olympics becoming the first Southeast Asian country to do so at the Winter Olympics. The said figure skater was Michael Christian Martinez.

Team sports

Basketball

Basketball was introduced in the country during the American colonial era and was one of the sports contested at the now defunct Far Eastern Championship Games. The men's national team has competed in the Summer Olympics making their debut in 1936 although they have been absent in the recent editions of the Games.They have also competed in the FIBA World Cup with the country hosting the tournament when it was still known as the FIBA World Championships in 1978.Their third-place finish in the 1954 edition was their best performance in the tournament, they will host the 2023 edition with Japan and Indonesia.

The Philippine Basketball Association is the oldest league in Asia and is the top basketball league in the country. Other rival or smaller leagues in the country are organized.  There are college basketball leagues and competitions such as the Philippine Collegiate Championship.  Basketball matches of the University Athletic Association of the Philippines and the National Collegiate Athletic Association also receives attention.

The country also has a women's basketball team which has competed at the FIBA Asia Women's Championship, as well as men youth team's and 3x3 national teams.

The Samahang Basketbol ng Pilipinas (Basketball Federation of the Philippines) is the national sport association of basketball in the Philippines.

Association football

Football in the country dates back in the 1890s. The men's national team of the Philippines played their earlier matches prior to World War II against China and Japan at the Far Eastern Championship Games.They experience a decline after that period but has since recovered following their stint at the 2010 AFF Championship. The country also organizes a women's national team which has competed at the AFC Women's Asian Cup. During the 2022 AFC Women's Asian Cup, the Philippines delivered a 1-0 shock win against Thailand, before losing against Australia 4-0, before coming back to win 6-0 against Indonesia, ensuring a spot in the Asian Cup quarter finals, facing Taiwan and winning 4-3 on penalties after a 1-1 draw in extra time, giving them their first ever FIFA Women's World Cup qualification, for 2023. They faced South Korea in the Semis where they lost, 2-0.

The Philippines Football League is the top flight football league in the country. Each club represents their respective cities or provinces and required to have a youth squad for the Youth League. It also helps to promote football awareness and grassroots program to the young Filipino footballers who admire to play professional football.

The Philippine Football Federation is the governing body for football in the country.

Volleyball 

The NSA affiliated with the sport is called the Philippine National Volleyball Federation. Women's volleyball currently enjoys immense popularity primarily due to its growing fan base in the University Athletic Association of the Philippines and the National Collegiate Athletic Association amateur tournaments.

Internationally, competitors are given the opportunity to represent the country in tournaments such as the Southeast Asian Games as well as the Olympics.

The sport has also seen the development of leagues such as the Philippine Super Liga, Spikers' Turf and the Premier Volleyball League.

American football
American football is a relatively new sport to the Philippines. ArenaBall Philippines was the first league and lasted from 2009 to 2015. In 2016 the Philippine-American Football League was founded.

The Philippines also organizes a men's national team.

Famous Filipino players to have played in the National Football League in the United States include Eugene Amano, Tim Tebow, Roman Gabriel, Tedy Bruschi, Chris Gocong, Steve Slaton, Aaron Francisco, Jordan Dizon, and Doug Baldwin.

In the 2010s the Super Bowl has begun to be aired in the country on over the air television. The sport has gained some popularity in the Philippines.

Baseball
 
Baseball was introduced in the Philippines by the Americans. The first baseball game in the Philippines was played in September 1898 weeks after the Battle of Manila, a match between Astor Battery led by George Wetlaufer and a regiment from the American Army. From 1899 to 1900, baseball clubs were established by local Filipinos. The sport's introduction aided the American colonial government's assimilation efforts. General Otis planned to eliminate local cockfighting through the introduction of the sport. A baseball league composing of six clubs was established. Then, Governor General William Howard Taft encouraged baseball in the archipelago. Baseball grew to be a popular sport in the country. The national team is Philippines national baseball team and the governing body is PABA

Rugby league
Rugby league was first played in the Philippines in 2012. The Philippines National Rugby League are the governing body and are responsible for the growth of rugby league in the Philippines. The sport was introduced to the Philippine Merchant Marine Academy by Australian expats. Clubs have also been established by Papua New Guinean expats and students (where rugby league is their national sport).

The national team are known as the Tamaraws and represents the country in international rugby league competition.

Rugby union

The Philippine Rugby Football Union was founded in 1998 and is the governing body of rugby union in the Philippines. There are currently around 12 schools playing rugby union in the Philippines and 10 teams that compete in regular competition. The national team is known as the Volcanoes and competes in the Asia Rugby Championship and the Asian Sevens Series.

Sports leagues
The following are the main domestic leagues (or de facto top-flight leagues) in the Philippines.

Olympics and Paralympics

The Philippines has participated in all editions of the Olympics except in 1980 when it joined the American-led boycott of the 1980 Summer Olympics. The country is also the first tropical nation to participate at the Winter Olympics, debuting at the 1972 edition and has participated in three other edition of the winter games.

The Philippines has also participated in the Summer Paralympics although it has still to make its debut in the Winter Paralympics.

The country won its first Olympic gold medal at the 2020 Summer Olympics through weightlifter Hidilyn Diaz.

All time medal count 

 For ASEAN University Games, Arafura Games, Games of the New Emerging Forces, and FESPIC Games data is not complete.
 As 2021

Regional Hosting

World and Continental Championship hosting

Domestic multi-sport competitions
The Philippine government organizes the Palarong Pambansa, the national games for student-athletes in the country which often serves as a route for Filipinos to be scouted to national teams of their respective sports.

Other domestic games include the Philippine National Games and the Batang Pinoy.

Corruption and mismanagement
Graft and corruption are major issues in the Philippine sports industry. Graham Lim, a former secretary general of the Basketball Association of the Philippines, a former POC-recognized national federation for basketball, said in a The Manila Times article that politics and monopoly in Philippine sports started when the present leaders, including Peping Cojuangco, the then Philippine Olympic Committee president and his golfer-friend Richie Garcia, the then chairman of the Philippine Sports Commission, took over the control of the sporting sector in 2005 that made Philippine athletes to suffer decline and deterioration on their high-caliber quality due to corruption and politicking. In 2009, Lim was arrested and later declared an "undesirable alien" by the Department of Justice due to countless deportation cases, in connection with his questionable citizenship, said that the deportation order is issued because the pressure pushed by his arch-rivals Manny V. Pangilinan, the then head of the Samahang Basketbol ng Pilipinas, the later-recognized NSA for basketball and Cojuangco.

Lim also exposed a top government official, through a deputy has asked 6 million pesos to settle the case, also he claims that several NSAs (National Sports Associations) are headed by some people who have "toe the line" to Cojuangco and anyone who do not follow his orders would be dismissed "by hook or by crook". An NSA also questioned the appointment of Cojuangco's daughter Mikee as the representative of the Philippines in the International Olympic Committee without any caution. Former Senator Nikki Coseteng also noted that the suffrage of the athletes was emerged due to lack of foreign exposures and depleted training program as a result on sports bodies' insufficient budget and incompetent sports officials.

Senator Antonio Trillanes IV, the former Table Tennis Association of the Philippines president filed a graft and corruption case against Cojuangco and Garcia in 2012 due to issuance of checks and releasing of funds of PSC to the group of Ting Ledesma who have claimed as TATAP officials despite a court case filed by Manila Regional Title Court on the legitimacy of TATAP officials.

A column by Jarius Bondoc in the Philippine Star dated March 2, 2016, reported that more than 1 billion pesos of earnings from casinos that supposed to fund the sports development program of the PSC by the First Cagayan Leisure and Resort Corporation, have been diverted into the account of former Philippine National Police chief Alan Purisima from 2012 to 2015.

In March 2015, Edgardo Cantada, brother of prominent broadcaster Joe Cantada and president of the now-unrecognized by the POC, Philippine Volleyball Federation, also questioned Cojuangco on the removal of the body into the local olympic commission, and replaced by another formed NSA by Cojuangco, Larong Volleyball sa Pilipinas. Cantada pointed three reasons that POC is under dictatorship: worsening campaign for the national teams in international tourneys, including the Southeast Asian Games, NSAs in turmoil against POC are involved and the negligence and corruption issues between Cojuangco's favorite national sports associations.

See also
 Philippine Olympic Committee
 Philippine Sports Commission
 Department of Sports (Philippines)
 Philippines at the Southeast Asian Games
 Project Gintong Alay
 POC-PSC Philippine National Games
 Palarong Pambansa
 Batang Pinoy
 Bodybuilding in the Philippines
 Horseracing in the Philippines
 Volleyball in the Philippines

Notes

References

External links
 Most Memorable Dates in Philippine Sports
 Philippine Sports Commission – National Sports Associations
 Sports Philippines – Sports News, Updates, and Stories
 Philippine National Council for the Welfare of Disabled Persons
 The Philippine Sailing Association
 International Association For Disabled Sailing
 Baseball Philippines
 Philippine Ultimate Association